Higashikuze Michitomi April–November 1868
 Terashima Munenori 1868–1869
 Mutsu Munemitsu 1871–1872
 Ōe Taku 1872–1874
 Nomura Yasushi 1876–1881
 Asada Tokunori (1st term) 1889–1891
 Utsumi Tadakatsu 1891–1893
 Asada Tokunori 2nd term 1898–1900
 Chūichi Ariyoshi 1915–1919
 Yasukouchi Asakichi 1922–1924
 Seino Chotarno 1924-1925
 Zenjirō Horikiri 1925–1926
 Ikeda Hiroshi 1926-1929
 Jiro Yamagata 1929–1931
 Sukenari Yokoyama 1932–1935
 Seiichi Ōmura 1938–1939
 Ichisho Inuma 1939–1940
 Mitsuma Matsumura 1940–1942
 Iwataro Uchiyama 1947-1967
 Bungo Tsuda 1967–1975
 Kazuji Nagasu 1975-1995
 Hiroshi Okazaki 1995-2003
 Shigefumi Matsuzawa 2003–2011
 Yuji Kuroiwa 2011–present

 
Kanagawa Prefecture